Jorge Alejandro Contreras Lira (born July 3, 1960 in Lo Barnechea), usually known by his nickname Coke Contreras, is a former Chilean football forward.

Career
He earned 25 caps for the Chile national team during his career, scoring two goals. Contreras retired in 1998.

Honours

Player
Universidad Católica
 Copa Chile: 1991

Colo-Colo
 Chilean Primera División: 1993
 Copa Chile: 1994

Chile
 : 
 Copa Expedito Teixeira: 1990

Manager
Barnechea
 Segunda División Profesional:

References

External links

 playerhistory

1960 births
Living people
Footballers from Santiago
Chilean footballers
Chile international footballers
Association football forwards
1987 Copa América players
1991 Copa América players
Club Deportivo Palestino footballers
Regional Atacama footballers
UD Las Palmas players
Club Deportivo Universidad Católica footballers
Colo-Colo footballers
Tampico Madero F.C. footballers
Deportes Concepción (Chile) footballers
Santiago Wanderers footballers
Chilean Primera División players
Primera B de Chile players
Segunda División players
La Liga players
Liga MX players
Chilean expatriate footballers
Chilean expatriate sportspeople in Spain
Chilean expatriate sportspeople in Mexico
Expatriate footballers in Spain
Expatriate footballers in Mexico
Chilean football managers
Unión La Calera managers
Deportes Puerto Montt managers
Deportes Melipilla managers
Deportes Iberia managers
Primera B de Chile managers
Segunda División Profesional de Chile managers